The Saturn izdeliye 30 is the designation for a turbofan engine being developed by NPO Saturn to succeed the Lyulka-Saturn AL-41F1 for improved variants of the Sukhoi Su-57, as well as new potential tactical fighters such as the Sukhoi Su-75 Checkmate.

Development
In the 1990s, the collapse of the Soviet Union resulted in the disruption of funding and lengthy delays of the Mikoyan Project 1.44 for the MFI fifth-generation fighter program along with its engines, the variable cycle 18–tonne (177 kN, 40,000 lbf) class NPO Lyulka-Saturn AL-41F, internally designated izdeliye 20. In 1999, as the MFI and LFI programs were gradually being abandoned, the Russian Defence Ministry initiated the more affordable PAK FA next-generation fighter program to replace the MiG-29 and Su-27. The competition was announced in April 2001, and Sukhoi submitted its T-50 proposal with a pair of 14.5-tonne (142 kN, 32,000 lbf) class Lyulka-Saturn AL-41F1, internally designated izdeliye 117, for the PAK FA. Sukhoi was selected as the winner of the competition in April 2002 and in April 2004, it signed a contract with Lyulka-Saturn, now NPO Saturn, to develop the AL-41F1. Despite its name, the engine is actually a highly uprated and improved variant of the earlier-generation Lyulka AL-31, originally designed for the Su-27. While the AL-41F1 used the same basic architecture, it had 80% new parts and applied technology from Lyulka-Saturn's original AL-41F, which was too large for the T-50.

Although Sukhoi specified the AL-41F1 in the contract, the bureau anticipates that its T-50 design, eventually designated the Su-57, would be the basis for a family of stealth combat aircraft, with future variants employing more powerful engines. Following a competition between NPO Saturn and MMPP Salyut, the former was selected to develop the new engine, a clean-sheet design designated the izdeliye 30, that would equip the improved Su-57M variant in the mid-2020s. Compared to the AL-41F1, the new powerplant will have increased thrust, lower costs, better fuel efficiency, and fewer moving parts; the engine also has glass-fibre plastic inlet guide-vanes (IGV) and a new nozzle with serrated flaps to reduce the aircraft's radar signature. Those features, along with subsequently improved reliability and lower maintenance costs will improve the aircraft performance and reliability. Full scale development began in 2011 and the engine's compressor began bench testing in December 2014. The first test engines were completed in 2016. The new powerplant is designed to be a drop-in replacement for the AL-41F1 with minimal changes to the airframe.

First flight of the engine on an Su-57 prototype occurred on 5 December 2017 with the second prototype (T-50-2, bort no. 052). However, the engine’s development has seen a sluggish flight test pace; originally planned to enter service in the early 2020s, the izdeliye 30’s planned introduction has been delayed to the mid-2020s.

Design

The izdeliye 30 is a two-shaft low-bypass afterburning turbofan engine. The architecture is a three-stage fan driven by a single-stage low pressure turbine and five-stage high pressure compressor driven by single-stage high pressure turbine. Unlike its AL-41F1 predecessor, the engine has glass-fiber plastic IGVs and convergent-divergent nozzles that use serrated flaps to reduce its radar signature. The engine has full authority digital engine control (FADEC) to ensure its reliability in various operating conditions.

Applications
 Sukhoi Su-57M (planned)
 Sukhoi Su-75 Checkmate (planned, derivative)

Specifications (izdeliye 30)

See also

References

Notes

References

Bibliography
 

izdeliye 30
Low-bypass turbofan engines